Gökhan İnler (born 27 June 1984) is a Swiss professional footballer who plays as a central midfielder for  club Adana Demirspor.

İnler began his professional career with FC Basel and later joined FC Aarau and FC Zürich, winning the Swiss Super League in both of his seasons with the latter. After four seasons with Udinese in the Italian Serie A, he joined Napoli in 2011, where he twice won the Coppa Italia.

İnler played under-21 football for both Switzerland and Turkey. He made his debut for the Switzerland senior team in 2006 and has since earned 89 caps, scoring seven goals, making him the nation's fifth-most capped player of all time. He represented the squad at UEFA Euro 2008 and two FIFA World Cups, captaining the Swiss in Brazil in 2014.

Club career

Early career

Born in Olten in the Canton of Solothurn, İnler began his career at FC Basel, later FC Aarau. On 20 March 2005, he made his Swiss Super League debut in a 2–3 home defeat against Grasshoppers. In January 2006, he was signed by FC Zürich and was part of the 2005–06 and 2007–08 Swiss championship-winning teams.

Udinese

2007–08 season
İnler joined Udinese of the Italian Serie A in July 2007 after the Udine-based club met a buy-out clause in his Zürich contract, joining for an undisclosed fee and signing a five-year contract. He scored his first goal for Udinese in a 2–1 win over Torino, netting in the 52nd minute to make the score 2–0 for Udinese. On 30 March 2008, İnler scored his second Serie A goal, opening the scoring in an eventual 3–1 win over Fiorentina. İnler also set-up striker Antonio Di Natale for the winning goal later in the match. In İnler's first season in Italy, he started all domestic games for Udinese, scoring two goals and providing two assists. İnler and Udinese had a very successful season, finishing seventh in Serie A and thus earning a berth in the first round of next season's UEFA Cup.

2008–09 season
On the opening day of the 2008–09 Serie A season, İnler scored the third goal of a 3–1 win over Palermo and provided an assist for one of Antonio Di Natale's two goals. On 18 September, İnler then scored in the first leg of a UEFA Cup qualifying round game away against Borussia Dortmund, a game Udinese won 0–2. Despite then losing the home leg 0–2 courtesy of two goals from Tamas Hajnal, Udinese progressed after winning 4–3 in penalties, with İnler converting his kick. İnler featured in all four of Udinese's group stage games as they finished first in their group with nine points. In the Round of 16, İnler started both legs against reigning champions Zenit Saint Petersburg, as Udinese won 2–1 on aggregate against the Russians. In the quarterfinal round against Werder Bremen, Udinese lost the first leg 3–1 away from home, but in the second leg, İnler struck early on for the hosts, netting a dipping shot from over 25 yards out. Diego equalized for the Germans before Fabio Quagliarella netted twice before the break to bring the aggregate score to 4–4. Two second-half goals for Bremen, however, meant that the hosts were knocked out at the quarterfinal stage.

İnler's goal against Palermo proved to be his only league goal of the season, but he provided three more assists, including one helper in a stunning 6–2 victory over Cagliari on the final matchday of the season. The win assured that Udinese once again finished seventh in Serie A, this time five points behind Roma for the last European spot.

2009–10 season
Udinese and İnler found the next season much more difficult. The playmaker did not have a successful season following his breakout campaign in the UEFA Cup from the previous year. He failed to score in 33 Serie A appearances and only provided one assist to Antonio Di Natale in a 2–1 loss to eventual champions Internazionale. Udinese only secured their Serie A safety on the penultimate day of the season after a 2–2 draw at Cagliari, which also saw the hosts confirm their Serie A place for the next season. Four days later, İnler scored for Switzerland in a 1–1 draw against Italy in an international friendly in preparation for the 2010 FIFA World Cup, with former teammate Fabio Quagliarella scoring for the reigning world champions.

2010–11 season
İnler and Udinese continued their poor form from the previous year to begin the 2010–11 Serie A campaign, losing four of their first five games, though fortunes quickly started to turn around for each. Udinese went on a streak of six-straight games without a loss, winning four in a row; in one game, İnler set up Antonio Floro Flores to level for the hosts against Cagliari, a game ending in a 1–1 draw on 7 November 2010. Following the winter break, İnler grabbed an assist in Udinese's 2–0 win over Chievo on 6 January 2011. In an enthralling game at the San Siro the next Sunday, İnler provided Antonio Di Natale with one of his goals in a 4–4 draw against eventual champions Milan. İnler then scored his first goal of the season in a 3–0 win over Cesena. The result meant that Udinese had not lost in 2011, a span of eight games, and moved up to sixth in the league table. Udinese drew their next game against Brescia before winning their next four, including a 7–0 thrashing of Palermo away from home. In the 13th and final game of their unbeaten streak, İnler scored against Catania in a 2–0 win. After finally losing, a 2–0 defeat to Lecce, İnler continued his fine run of form, scoring in a 2–1 win over title-chasers Napoli. Udinese drew with Milan on 22 May, confirming the former's fourth-place finish and Italy's final UEFA Champions League berth with one game remaining in the season.

Napoli

Because of his good form in Udinese, helping them finish fourth in the 2010–11 Serie A table and securing a Champions League playoff spot, transfer speculation was rife that İnler would be on the move. In May 2011, Udinese agreed a deal with Napoli in a deal for the player worth €13 million. In July, İnler agreed personal terms with Napoli and was unveiled on 11 July, being presented in an unconventional manner, wearing a lion mask to hide his identity and sporting the jersey number 88. He made his Napoli début in their 3–1 away win at Cesena on 10 September. İnler provided an assist for Federico Fernández in a 3–2 defeat to Bayern Munich in the group stages of the Champions League on 2 November. In the same game, he was involved in a challenge with Bastian Schweinsteiger that resulted in the German international requiring surgery for a broken collarbone. On 7 December, İnler scored his first goal for both his new club and in the Champions League; he opened the scoring with a left-footed drive in a 0–2 away win over Villarreal CF in the final game of the group stage phase, a win that took Napoli through to the knockout stages of the competition.

In Napoli's Round of 16 tie against Chelsea, İnler scored a long-range drive in the second leg at Stamford Bridge to send the game into extra-time. A late goal from Branislav Ivanović, however, ensured Chelsea progressed to the quarterfinals 5–4 on aggregate. On 25 April 2012, Napoli headed to the Stadio Via del Mare to face Lecce, where İnler provided both assists for goals by Marek Hamšík and Edinson Cavani, helping Napoli climb to fourth in Serie A standings. Later on in the season, İnler played in the Coppa Italia Final against Scudetto winners Juventus, winning his first piece of silverware with the Partenopei after they defeated league-champions Juve 2–0.

On 3 May 2014, İnler was sent off in Napoli's victory over Fiorentina in the 2014 Coppa Italia Final.

Leicester City
On 19 August 2015, İnler joined Premier League club Leicester City on a three-year contract for an undisclosed fee—reported to be £3 million—where he received the number 33 jersey. He made his début three days later, replacing Danny Drinkwater for the final ten minutes of a 1–1 draw with Tottenham Hotspur at King Power Stadium. Due to the good performances of Drinkwater and N'Golo Kanté, İnler totalled only seven Leicester appearances by the end of the calendar year. As a result, Inler was not called up to the Switzerland squad for Euro 2016. Nevertheless, he played the minimum five league games required to be eligible for a winner's medal when Leicester became 2015–16 Premier League champions.

Beşiktaş
On 31 August 2016, İnler signed a two-year deal for Süper Lig club Beşiktaş, and received the number 80 jersey.

İstanbul Başakşehir
In the summer of 2017, after spending one season at Beşiktaş, İnler moved to league rivals İstanbul Başakşehir on a free transfer.

International career
İnler played for the Swiss and Turkish national under-21 teams before making his début for the Swiss senior team. On 2 September 2006, he made his senior international début in a friendly against Venezuela in Basel. İnler played all of Switzerland's matches at UEFA Euro 2008 in which they were eliminated at the group stage on home soil.

In the absence of regular captain Alexander Frei, on 16 June 2010, İnler captained Switzerland in a 1–0 win against Spain in the group stage of the 2010 FIFA World Cup. Frei returned for the second group game, but İnler was again the captain in the third, a goalless draw with Honduras.

After Frei's retirement in 2011, İnler became the Swiss captain, and played all four matches as they reached the last 16 of the 2014 FIFA World Cup. He was left out of the Swiss squad for UEFA Euro 2016 due to his lack of game time at Leicester City during the 2015–16 season.

Style of play
A hard-working, tenacious, and tactically versatile midfielder, İnler is capable of aiding his team both defensively and offensively; an intelligent player, he is known both for his stamina and his movements off the ball, although his most prominent trait is his powerful and accurate striking ability from distance with both feet, and also from set pieces, which enables him to contribute to his team's offensive play with goals from midfield. Primarily a ball-winner, İnler is usually deployed as a central or defensive midfielder, where he is also capable of functioning creatively as a deep-lying playmaker in front of the defensive line, due to his vision, passing range, and ability to control the tempo of his team's play; his long passing accuracy allows him to effectively switch the play and create chances for teammates after winning back possession. Due to his height and physical attributes, he is also effective in the air.

Personal life
İnler, born and brought up in Switzerland, has parents of Turkish origin.

Career statistics

Club
.

International
.

.

Honours
Zürich
Swiss Super League: 2005–06, 2006–07

Napoli
Coppa Italia: 2011–12, 2013–14
Supercoppa Italiana: 2014

Leicester City
Premier League: 2015–16

Beşiktaş J.K.
Süper Lig: 2016–17

İstanbul Başakşehir
Süper Lig: 2019–20

Adana Demirspor
TFF First League: 2020–21

References

External links

 
 Gökhan Inler at dbFCZ.ch 
 
 
 
 Official website

1984 births
Living people
People from Olten
Swiss men's footballers
Switzerland international footballers
Switzerland youth international footballers
Switzerland under-21 international footballers
Turkish footballers
Turkey youth international footballers
Turkey under-21 international footballers
Swiss people of Turkish descent
Association football midfielders
FC Solothurn players
FC Basel players
FC Aarau players
FC Zürich players
Udinese Calcio players
S.S.C. Napoli players
Leicester City F.C. players
Beşiktaş J.K. footballers
İstanbul Başakşehir F.K. players
Adana Demirspor footballers
Swiss Super League players
Serie A players
Premier League players
Süper Lig players
UEFA Euro 2008 players
Turkish expatriate footballers
Turkish expatriate sportspeople in Italy
Turkish expatriate sportspeople in England
Swiss expatriate footballers
Swiss expatriate sportspeople in Italy
Swiss expatriate sportspeople in England
Swiss expatriate sportspeople in Turkey
Expatriate footballers in Italy
Expatriate footballers in England
Expatriate footballers in Turkey
2010 FIFA World Cup players
2014 FIFA World Cup players
Sportspeople from the canton of Solothurn